

Singles

References

Chinese music-related lists